Major Sir Edward Coates, 1st Baronet, DL (25 February 1853 – 14 August 1921), was a British stockbroker and politician.

Early life
Sir Edward Coates was born in 1853. His father, John Coates, was a magistrate. He was educated at Marlborough College.

Career
Coates was a member of the city stockbroking firm of Coates and Son.

In 1903 he was elected Conservative Party Member of Parliament (MP) for Lewisham. When that constituency was abolished in 1918 he won the new seat of Lewisham West which he held until his death.

He was an art collector who specialised in old prints and was a trustee of the National Portrait Gallery. He was also a sportsman who took part in shooting, hunting, yachting and coach-driving, and won numerous cups and trophies.

In 1905, he was appointed a deputy lieutenant of Surrey. He was an alderman in Surrey County Council, being chairman of the finance committee for ten years and chairman of the council for four. He was a member of the Duke of Wellington's Regiment and was made a baronet in 1911.

Death
Coates died on 14 August 1921.

References

External links 
 
Parliamentary Archives, Papers of Sir Edward Feetham Coates, MP

1853 births
1921 deaths
Conservative Party (UK) MPs for English constituencies
UK MPs 1900–1906
UK MPs 1906–1910
UK MPs 1910
UK MPs 1910–1918
UK MPs 1918–1922
Baronets in the Baronetage of the United Kingdom
Members of Surrey County Council
People educated at Marlborough College
Deputy Lieutenants of Surrey
English stockbrokers
English art collectors
Trustees of the National Portrait Gallery